The 2020–21 Red Star Belgrade season was the club's 15th in the Serbian SuperLiga and 75th consecutive season in the top flight of Yugoslav and Serbian football. The club participated in the Serbian SuperLiga and Serbian Cup winning them both, and took part in the UEFA Champions League and the UEFA Europa League.

Pre-season and friendlies

Competitions

Overview

Serbian SuperLiga

Season results summary

League table

Result round by round

Matches

Serbian Cup

First round

Second round

Quarterfinal

Semifinal

Final

UEFA Champions League

First qualifying round

Second qualifying round

Third qualifying round

UEFA Europa League

Play-off round

Group stage

Round of 32

Squad

Squad statistics

|-
! colspan=14 style="background:red; color:white; text-align:center;"| Goalkeepers

|-
! colspan=14 style="background:red; color:white; text-align:center;"| Defenders

|-
! colspan=14 style="background:red; color:white; text-align:center;"| Midfielders

|-
! colspan=14 style="background:red; color:white; text-align:center;"| Forwards

|-
! colspan=14 style="background:red; color:white; text-align:center;"| Players transferred out during the season
|-

Goalscorers
Includes all competitive matches. The list is sorted by shirt number when total goals are equal.

Clean sheets
Includes all competitive matches. The list is sorted by shirt number when total clean sheets are equal.

Disciplinary record

Transfers

In

Out

Loan returns and promotions

Loan out

See also 
2020–21 KK Crvena zvezda season

Notes

References

Red Star Belgrade seasons
Red Star
Red Star
2020–21 UEFA Europa League participants seasons
Serbian football championship-winning seasons